Important Intangible Cultural Properties may refer to:
 Important Intangible Cultural Properties of Japan based on the 1950 Japanese law
 Important Intangible Cultural Properties of Korea based on the Cultural Property Protection Law of Korea passed in 1962
 Intangible Cultural Heritage of the Philippines listed by the National Commission for Culture and the Arts
 UNESCO Intangible Cultural Heritage Lists